23S rRNA (cytidine1920-2'-O)-methyltransferase (TlyA) is an enzyme with systematic name S-adenosyl-L-methionine:23S rRNA (cytidine1920-2'-O)-methyltransferase. This enzyme catalyses the following chemical reaction

 S-adenosyl-L-methionine + cytidine1920 in 23S rRNA  S-adenosyl-L-homocysteine + 2'-O-methylcytidine1920 in 23S rRNA

This is a bifunctional enzyme from Mycobacterium tuberculosis.

References

External links 
 

EC 2.1.1